Robin Zwartjens (born 17 March 1998) is a Dutch football player. He plays for the Jong-team of ADO Den Haag.

Club career
He made his Eerste Divisie debut for Jong FC Utrecht on 21 August 2017 in a game against FC Oss. On 11 January 2020, Zwartjens moved to ADO Den Haag to play for the club's Jong-team.

References

External links
 

1998 births
Footballers from Delft
Living people
Dutch footballers
Association football defenders
Netherlands youth international footballers
Jong FC Utrecht players
Eerste Divisie players
Derde Divisie players